Ipomopsis congesta is a species of flowering plant in the phlox family, known by the common name ballhead ipomopsis. It is native to much of western North America, where it grows in many habitats from alpine peaks to low-elevation scrub. It is a perennial herb which varies in appearance, especially across subspecies and climates. It may take the form of a squat patch with stems under 10 centimeters in height or a more erect form up to 30 centimeters tall. The stems are often hairy to woolly. The thick leaves are usually fork-shaped with a number of clawlike lobes and 1 to 4 centimeters long. The flowers appear in a rounded, dense cluster atop the stem. Each flower is bell-shaped to funnel-shaped and white with a pale yellow throat and protruding yellow or white stamens. There are several subspecies, many of which were formerly considered species of Gilia.

External links
Jepson Manual Treatment
Photo gallery: I. congesta
Photo gallery: ssp. congesta
Photo gallery: ssp. montana

congesta
Flora of the Western United States
Flora without expected TNC conservation status